Harold Dawson (born 1886) was an English professional footballer. An outside left, he played in the Football League for Everton and Blackpool.

Career 
After a spell at Croydon Common, Dawson played his first Southern League First Division game for West Ham United on 16 March 1912, against Luton Town. He scored on his home debut a week later, against Bristol Rovers. He scored his second goal for West Ham in the first game of the 1912–13 season, against Exeter City, and his third and final goal for the club also came against West Country opposition when he scored against Plymouth Argyle on 5 October 1912. The last of his 22 appearances came against Merthyr Town on 18 January 1913. He returned to Croydon Common thereafter.

References

1886 births
Year of death missing
Footballers from Bolton
English footballers
Association football outside forwards
Rossendale United F.C. players
Everton F.C. players
Blackpool F.C. players
Croydon Common F.C. players
West Ham United F.C. players
Gillingham F.C. players
English Football League players
Southampton F.C. wartime guest players
Southern Football League players